Nzolameso v City of Westminster was a 2015 judgment by the Supreme Court of the United Kingdom that considered the way that local councils fulfil their duty to house the homeless. Section 208(1) of the Housing Act 1996 requires all local housing authorities to secure accommodation within their own district "so far as reasonably practicable".

Facts
In November 2012, Titina Nzolameso, a single mother of five children was evicted from her home in Westminster. She applied to Westminster City Council under the relevant homelessness provisions and in January 2013 the council offered her a house in Bletchley (approximately 50 miles away). Ms. Nzolameso turned this offer down on the basis that she was settled in Westminster, had ongoing health concerns and did not want her children to have to change schools. Given that the offer of housing had been refused, Westminster City Council then served notice that their housing duty had come to an end. Ms. Nzolameso then sought to review the decision under s.202 of the Housing Act 1996.

Judgment

Supreme Court
The decision by Westminster City Council that their housing duty had come to an end was quashed.

Handing down the leading judgment Lady Hale stated that because the authority had not explained and evidenced the reasons for their decision as  required

Footnotes

References

External links
Supreme Court Judgment

Supreme Court of the United Kingdom cases
2015 in case law
Homelessness in England
Homelessness and law
2010s in the City of Westminster